Regina Vilela (born 31 July 1951) is a Brazilian volleyball player. She competed in the women's tournament at the 1980 Summer Olympics.

References

1951 births
Living people
Brazilian women's volleyball players
Olympic volleyball players of Brazil
Volleyball players at the 1980 Summer Olympics
Volleyball players from Rio de Janeiro (city)